The Arlington Group was a coalition uniting the leaders of prominent Christian conservative organizations in the United States.  Founded in 2002 principally through the efforts of American Family Association President Donald Wildmon and Free Congress Foundation Chairman Paul Weyrich, the group sought to establish consensus goals and strategy among its members and translate its combined constituency into an overwhelming force within the Republican Party, particularly at its highest levels.  Its membership and purpose overlapped to a high degree with the Council for National Policy; but the group is much more narrowly focused, choosing to emphasize such issues as same-sex marriage, abortion, and confirmation of like-minded federal judges.

The group had mixed success.  While widely acknowledged to have the ear of President George W. Bush and his chief political advisor Karl Rove, and while generally successful in its efforts to coordinate the Christian Right, it also endured noteworthy embarrassments.  In early 2005, it threatened to withhold support for the President's proposed Social Security reforms if Bush did not vigorously support a federal constitutional ban on same-sex marriage.  This provoked a firestorm of unwelcome media attention, but failed to produce the group's desired result (despite the President's continuing support for both their specific and broader aims).  And later, in October 2005, Arlington Group Chairman and Focus on the Family founder James Dobson became the center of a minor scandal after leaking assurances made by Rove to an Arlington Group conference call regarding the pro-life credentials of Supreme Court nominee and White House counsel Harriet Miers.  Miers withdrew her nomination later that month, largely due to reservations among conservatives.

Membership 

The organization's deliberations were strictly off-the-record, and membership was previously held confidential, but the group launched a website in July 2006 which listed its member organizations.  In March 2007, the home page was taken down; according to an article in The Boston Globe, it was "abruptly disabled earlier this month after the Globe began making inquiries".

Since each group's principal served as its Arlington Group "member", but some of the groups were headed by a single principal (e.g., Focus on the Family and Focus on the Family Action are both headed by James Dobson), the site's list was somewhat confusing; and members were not required to disclose their participation.  However, the following organizations and individuals were identified as members as of 2006:

Alliance Defense Fund - Alan Sears
American Family Association - Donald Wildmon
American Values - Gary Bauer
Bott Radio Network - Richard Bott
Center for Moral Clarity - Rod Parsley
Citizens for Community Values - Phil Burress
Coalition of African American Pastors - William Owens, Sr.
ConservativeHQ.com - Richard Viguerie
Coral Ridge Ministries and Center for Reclaiming America - D. James Kennedy
Covenant Marriage Movement - Phil Waugh
Exodus International - Alan Chambers
Family Research Council and FRC Action - Tony Perkins
Florida Family Policy Council - John Stemberger
Fieldsted & Company - Howard Ahmanson, Jr.
Focus on the Family and Focus on the Family Action - James Dobson
Free Congress Foundation - Paul Weyrich
High Impact Leadership Coalition - Bishop Harry Jackson
Inspiration Television Network
Judeo-Christian Council for Constitutional Restoration and Vision America - Rick Scarborough
Liberty Counsel - Mathew Staver
Liberty University - Jerry Falwell
National Association of Evangelicals - Leith Anderson
Ohio Restoration Project - Russell Johnson
Salem Communications - Stuart Epperson
Southern Baptist Convention - Richard Land
Susan B. Anthony List - Marjorie Dannenfelser
Teen Mania Ministries - Ron Luce
TeenPact - Tim Echols
TheVanguard.org - Rod D. Martin
Tradition, Family, Property
Traditional Values Coalition - Lou Sheldon
Your Catholic Voice - Raymond Flynn

See also

Christian fundamentalism
Christian right
 Far-right politics
Radical right (United States)
 Council for National Policy, a related group

References

External links
 Arlington Group website
 "The Arlington Group", Paul Weyrich
 "The Money Behind the 2004 Marriage Amendments", Institute on Money in State Politics
  Backers of Gay Marriage Ban Use Social Security as Cudgel, The New York Times
 Religious Leaders Threaten Bush, The Washington Blade
 Did Christian conservatives receive assurances that Miers would oppose Roe v. Wade?, The Wall Street Journal
 ADL Urges Joint Effort Against Right

Political organizations based in the United States
Anti-abortion organizations in the United States
Christian organizations based in the United States
Deep politics
Conservative organizations in the United States
2002 establishments in the United States